Aragonés (meaning "Aragonese, from Aragón" in the Spanish and Aragonese languages) is a Spanish surname. Notable people with the surname include:

Carlos Aragonés (born 1956), Bolivian footballer and coach
Luis Aragonés (1938–2014), Spanish footballer and coach
Sergio Aragonés (born 1937), Spanish cartoonist and writer

See also
Aragonese (disambiguation)

Spanish-language surnames
Spanish toponymic surnames
Ethnonymic surnames